James Ralph Sasser (born September 30, 1936) is an American politician, diplomat, and attorney. A Democrat, Sasser served three terms as a United States senator from Tennessee from 1977 to 1995, and was Chairman of the Senate Budget Committee. From 1996 to 1999, during the Clinton Administration, he was the United States Ambassador to China.

Early life and career
James Ralph Sasser was born in Memphis, Tennessee on September 30, 1936. He attended public schools in Nashville. He attended the University of Tennessee from 1954 to 1955, where he joined the Lambda Chapter of the Kappa Sigma Fraternity. He earned his undergraduate degree from Vanderbilt University in 1958, followed by his law degree from the Vanderbilt University Law School in 1961. He was admitted to the Tennessee Bar in 1961 and began practicing law in Nashville.

From 1957 to 1963, he served in the United States Marine Corps Reserves.

Jim Sasser was a long time Democratic activist, manager of Albert Gore Sr.'s unsuccessful 1970 reelection campaign. A lawyer by trade, Sasser sought election in his own right and won his party's 1976 nomination for the Senate. He defeated, among others, Nashville entrepreneur and attorney John Jay Hooker, then still considered to be a serious candidate due to his strong personality, his (intermittent) wealth, and his connections with the Nashville Tennessean's controlling Seigenthaler family. His son Gray Sasser, also a lawyer, is the past chair of the Tennessee Democratic Party.

Senate campaigns

1976 election

Upon winning his party's Senate nomination, Sasser set out to attack the record of one-term incumbent Sen. Bill Brock, heir to a Chattanooga candy fortune. Sasser emphasized Brock's connections to former President Richard M. Nixon and his use of income tax code provisions that had, despite his great wealth and considerable income, resulted in his paying less than $2,000 in income tax the previous year. Sasser was able to capitalize on the tax issue by pointing out that Brock had paid less than many Tennesseans of considerably more modest means.

Sasser's campaign was also greatly aided by the efforts of ex-Senator Gore. Brock had defeated the elder Gore for the Senate in 1970 largely upon the basis of Gore's opposition to the Vietnam War. Sasser won handily over Brock, and went on to serve three Senate terms.

Re-election, 1982 and 1988

He turned back a serious effort against him by five-term United States Representative Robin Beard very handily in 1982. That showing was so impressive that his 1988 Republican opponent was a virtual political unknown named Bill Andersen, whose underfunded, essentially token campaign never stood a chance.

1994 re-election campaign

There were two unforeseen events that negated Sasser's popularity. Some Tennessee voters were discontented with the first two years of the Clinton administration, especially the proposal for a national health-care system largely put together and advocated by Clinton's wife, Hillary Clinton, as well as the passage of the Federal Assault Weapons Ban. The other was the somewhat unexpected nomination of Nashville heart transplant surgeon Bill Frist for the seat by the Republicans.

Frist was a political unknown and a total novice (who never voted until he was 36) at campaigning, but was from one of Nashville's most prominent and wealthiest medical families, which gave him name recognition, especially in the Nashville area, and resources adequate to match the campaign war chest built up by a typical three-term incumbent, a challenge most "insurgent" candidates find to be extremely difficult. A further factor working to Frist's advantage was a simultaneous Republican campaign by actor and attorney Fred Thompson for the other Tennessee Senate seat, which was held to replace Al Gore, who had resigned in 1993 to become Vice President of the United States. To an extent, Frist was able to bask in the reflected glory of this formidable stage presence, and additionally developed some campaigning skills, which were almost totally absent in the early stages of his campaign. Another factor in Frist's favor was that Sasser was never seen as possessing much charisma of his own. During the campaign Nashville radio stations were derisive towards Sasser to the point of stating that he could only win "a Kermit The Frog lookalike contest." In one of the largest upsets in a night of political upsets in the November 1994 U.S. general elections, Frist defeated incumbent Sasser by approximately 14 percentage points. As of January 2022, he is the last Democrat to have represented Tennessee in the U.S. Senate.

Senate accomplishments
With the retirement of Senator Lawton Chiles in 1989, Sasser became Chairman of the Senate Budget Committee. In that role, he served as a key ally of Senate Majority Leader George J. Mitchell of Maine. Sasser helped negotiate the 1990 budget summit agreement with President George H. W. Bush. And in 1993, he engineered passage of President Bill Clinton's first budget, which reduced the deficit by $500 billion over 10 years but passed without any Republican votes.

With these successes, Sasser began to work his way upward in the party leadership. When then-Senate Majority Leader Mitchell announced his intention to retire, Sasser was widely expected to be elected to the position, had he won a fourth term in the Senate.

Ambassador to China
Sasser went on to serve as ambassador to China during the period of alleged nuclear spying and the campaign finance controversy that involved possible efforts by China to influence domestic U.S. politics during the Clinton Administration. Sasser again gained media attention when the U.S. Embassy in Beijing was besieged after U.S. warplanes mistakenly bombed the Chinese embassy in Belgrade during the U.S. intervention in the Kosovo War. Shortly after the siege of the embassy was lifted, Ambassador Sasser retired (he was slated to do so before the siege, so his retirement was not a direct result) and returned to the United States, where he presently divides his time between Tennessee and Washington, D.C., as a consultant.

Electoral history

1976 Democratic Primary for U.S. Senate (TN)
Jim Sasser, 44%
John Jay Hooker, 31%
Harry Sadler, 10%
David Bolin, 8%
1976 General Election for U.S. Senate (TN)
Jim Sasser (D), 52%
Bill Brock (R) (inc.), 47%
1982 General Election for U.S. Senate (TN)
Jim Sasser (D) (inc.), 62%
Robin Beard (R), 38%
1988 General Election for U.S. Senate (TN)
Jim Sasser (D) (inc.), 65%
Bill Andersen (R), 35%
1994 General Election for U.S. Senate (TN)
Bill Frist (R), 56%
Jim Sasser (D) (inc.), 42%

Notes

References

External links

|-

|-

|-

|-

|-

1936 births
Living people
Politicians from Memphis, Tennessee
Ambassadors of the United States to China
Tennessee Democrats
Democratic Party United States senators from Tennessee
United States Marines
United States Marine Corps reservists